Franko Paul (born 29 November 1995) is an Indian professional footballer who plays as a winger.  Franko is an alumnus of St.Columba's School, New Delhi.

Early life 
Franko had an indisputable love for football since his early childhood days. He went to St. Columba's School in New Delhi, and would spend his afternoons after school kicking the ball and practicing free kicks. Slowly, he began to develop a deep love for the game, and would keep playing till it was dark. At the age of 8, he started playing for his school team in the junior competitions.

Franko represented his school at zonal level, and further at Inter-zonal level, even winning the competition. At the age of 16, Franko was selected to represent Delhi in the Bajaj Allianz Junior Camp (All India), 2012, held at Pune, and bagged the ‘Best Player’ award, despite his team finishing third in the competition.

Later that year, Franko joined Baichung Bhutia Football Schools (BBFS) in Delhi, at the age of 17. In 2013, BBFS took part in the Delhi Youth League (U-19) where Franko was awarded the ‘Best Player'.

In 2015, Paul moved to Germany and trained with DFI Bad Aibling e.V., a developmental team of the U19 Regionalliga West until 2016.

Personal life 
Franko grew up idolizing former Manchester United forward Cristiano Ronaldo, and based his gameplay skills on him, although as he grew older, he began to add his uniqueness to the game, picking pointers from several other players like Kaka and Ronaldinho. Franko is a lifelong supporter of Manchester United.

Career

Earlier career
Paul moved to Germany in early age age began his youth career with U19 Regionalliga West side DFI Bad Aibling e.V. in 2015. He came back to India in 2016 and plied his trade with Delhi-based club Sudeva Moonlight.

Churchill Brothers
In January 2017, Franko joined the new side Churchill Brothers, and his debut was against Shillong Lajong FC in December  2017 in the 80th minute replacing Israil Gurung. He was given the jersey number 29 by the club. Franko operates as a winger for his club, someone who is equally comfortably on either wing. He has seldom made appearances as a supporting striker, playing off the main striker.

Style of play 
A quick, creative, versatile attacker, Franko plays primarily as a winger, due to his high acceleration, close ball dribbling and wide array of technical skills. He is equally efficient playing on either wing, however, he prefers to play on the left, or as a left inside forward, so that he can drift in and shoot on goal from distance using his stronger foot. He can also be deployed as a supporting striker, and is described by his coaches as someone who loves to bring his teammates into the game. A good passer of the ball, with an elite vision for his teammates, Franko is revered amongst his colleagues as an apt crosser of the ball, with accurate set piece delivery and exceptional free kick ability.

Franko is predominantly right footed, but also possesses the ability to pick a pass, deliver crosses, and finish efficiently using his left foot. Franko is praised by his teammates for being a technical player, who has admirable off the ball movement, which also allows him to get into good attacking positions. He is described by his manager as someone who possesses an explosive burst of pace, highly aware positioning, and clinical finishing skills.

He is notable for his dribbling and flair, displaying a wide array of tricks to beat his marker.

Honours and achievements

Bajaj Allianz Junior Camp (2012) 

 Best Player Award

Delhi Youth League (U-19) (2013) 

 Best Player Award

Career statistics

See also
 List of Indian football players in foreign leagues

References

External links 
Franko Paul at the-aiff.com
Franko Paul at flashscore.in
 Franko Paul at espnfc.com

1995 births
Living people
Indian footballers
I-League players
Association football midfielders
Churchill Brothers FC Goa players
Sudeva Delhi FC players
Hindustan FC players
Indian expatriate footballers
Footballers from Delhi